Baron  was an admiral of the early modern Imperial Japanese Navy, known primarily for his role in the First Sino-Japanese War.

Biography
Hidaka was the second son of a samurai in the service of the Shimazu clan of Satsuma Domain, and was born in Kagoshima.

In 1870, he enrolled in the 2nd class of the Imperial Japanese Naval Academy and as a cadet was part of the team which brought the corvette  from its shipyards in England back to Japan in 1871.

Hidaka returned to the Navy General Staff in 1886, and was sent to Europe in 1887-1888. He returned to sea as captain of the corvette , his first command, in 1890. After a year as commandant of the Naval Artillery School from 1893–1894, he was appointed captain of the cruiser  during the First Sino-Japanese War, participating in the Battle of the Yalu. He was then assigned to command  in 1895, a post he held simultaneously with that of commandant of the Imperial Japanese Naval Academy, since Matsushima was under repairs for damages suffered during the war for most of this time.

Hidaka was promoted to rear admiral in 1896 and became commander in chief of the Readiness Fleet in 1898. He was promoted to vice admiral in 1900, and became commander of the Takeshiki Guard District. He returned to command the Readiness Fleet again from 1902–1903, and was then appointed commander of the Maizuru Naval District.

With the start of the Russo-Japanese War, Hidaka was in line for promotion to command the Combined Fleet against the Imperial Russian Navy. However, Minister of the Navy Yamamoto Gonnohyōe selected Tōgō Heihachirō instead. When questioned about his decision by Emperor Meiji, Yamamoto replied that it was because “Togo was lucky”.

Hidaka was ennobled with the title of baron (danshaku) under the kazoku peerage system in 1907, and was promoted to full admiral in 1908. He retired from active service in 1909, and from the reserves in 1918. He died in 1932.

In popular culture
In the semi-historical television adaption of Ryōtarō Shiba’s Saka no ue no kumo role of Hidaka was played by veteran actor Akira Nakao

References

Books

External links

Notes 

1848 births
1932 deaths
People from Satsuma Domain
Military personnel from Kagoshima Prefecture
Imperial Japanese Navy admirals
Kazoku
Recipients of the Order of the Golden Kite, 2nd class
Japanese military personnel of the First Sino-Japanese War
People of Meiji-period Japan
Japanese military personnel of the Russo-Japanese War